György Korsós (born 22 August 1976) is a Hungarian footballer who currently plays as a central defender for Austria Wien.

He made his debut for the Hungarian national team in 1998, and got 33 caps and 1 goal until 2005. He has played in a total of 21 champions League games   which is the  UEFA Champions League record games for all Hungarian players.

Honours
With Sturm Graz
Austrian Bundesliga: Runners-up 2000 & 2002
ÖFB-Cup: Runner-up 2002
Austrian Supercup: Runner-up 2002
With Rapid Wien:
Austrian Bundesliga: 2005

References

1976 births
Living people
Hungarian footballers
Hungary international footballers
Xanthi F.C. players
Expatriate footballers in Greece
SK Sturm Graz players
SK Rapid Wien players
Expatriate footballers in Austria
Austrian Football Bundesliga players
Association football defenders
Sportspeople from Győr